Van Halen 2007–2008 Tour was a North American concert tour occurring in the fall of 2007 and winter and spring of 2008 for hard rock band Van Halen. It was Van Halen's first tour since 2004 (which itself was the band's only tour since 1998), and the first one with original singer David Lee Roth since he left the band in 1985. Roth was with the band from 1974 to 1985, when the band rose to prominence.

The tour was originally going to be a fifty date summer tour in 2007 due to the massive success, selling out in almost every city played the tour was Van Halens highest grossing tour to date. When rescheduled, it was announced as a twenty-five date tour in Winter 2007. Gradually, dates were added, bringing it up to forty dates. In November 2007, the band announced an extension of the tour into 2008, eventually adding thirty-four new dates to the tour, bringing the total up to seventy-four, ending in April . Ultimately, the tour was then re-branded as the "Van Halen 2007–2008 North American Tour". A number of dates were postponed in early March, due to a reported illness Eddie Van Halen appeared to be suffering from.

History
A Van Halen tour with Roth was rumoured for months beforehand, and there had been discussions about a reunion with him for years (in part fueled by Roth's first public attempt at a reunion with Van Halen going wrong) but with no success. "Ed and Al hated that guy," noted Sammy Hagar. "Really hated him. I would never have believed they'd get back together." Three times in 2000–2001, Roth entered the 5150 studio (Eddie Van Halen's personal recording studio) with the Van Halen brothers to jam.

An angle to the tour was that Eddie Van Halen's 16-year-old son Wolfgang Van Halen was the new bassist; the first time any slot other than the vocalist had changed since 1974. This offended many fans because original bassist Michael Anthony was not asked to be a part of this reunion. Wolfgang was a mere 16 years old at the time. However the tour sold well, selling out several dates. Initially 25 dates across the USA/Canada were announced, but 50 more were added due to the demand.

The tour started on September 27, 2007 and finished on July 3, 2008 with a total of 76 dates. The band's last tour, with Sammy Hagar in 2004 (against which this tour was compared directly), was originally set to be 50 dates and was extended to 80.

Ky-Mani Marley, son of reggae artist Bob Marley, opened each show bar the final two during the first three legs of the tour. R&B singer Ryan Shaw announced that, beginning on February 22, he would be the opening act for the remainder of the tour. Shaw began to tour with the band starting with the Las Vegas show on April 19.

The tour was officially named the "Van Halen Fall 2007 Tour" during early announcements. A "Merry Christmas" message on the Van Halen website referred to the "2007 tour", with no new title given for the 2008 leg. The website merely stated, "As Van Halen readies for a much needed holiday break, it's back on the road in 2008 to continue the tour." Extra dates were added repeatedly, and all postponed dates were made up for at later stages, with no information on if the "2007 tour" actually had a scheduled ending.

Ultimately, the tour grossed over $93 million, the band's most profitable to date.

Setlist

"You Really Got Me" (The Kinks cover)
"I'm the One"
"Runnin' with the Devil"
"Romeo Delight"
"Somebody Get Me a Doctor"
"Beautiful Girls"
"Dance the Night Away"
"Atomic Punk"
"Everybody Wants Some!!"
"So This Is Love?"
"Mean Street"
"Oh, Pretty Woman" (Roy Orbison cover)
Alex Van Halen drum solo
"Unchained"
"I'll Wait"
"And the Cradle Will Rock..."
"Hot for Teacher"
"Little Dreamer"
"Little Guitars"
"Jamie's Cryin'"
"Ice Cream Man" (John Brim cover)
"Panama"
Eddie Van Halen guitar solo" [and "Eruption", "Spanish Fly", "Cathedral", "Women in Love..." (Intro), and "316"]
"Ain't Talkin' 'Bout Love"
Encore
"1984" and "Jump"

Information
 "Little Guitars" (Dropped from the setlist after the second leg.)

Personnel
Van Halen
David Lee Roth – lead vocals
Eddie Van Halen – lead guitar, keyboards, backing vocals
Wolfgang Van Halen – bass guitar, backing vocals
Alex Van Halen – drums, percussion

Support acts
Ky-Mani Marley
The Tragically Hip
Passafire
Ryan Shaw

Tour dates

 David Lee Roth's first show with Van Halen since September 2, 1984.
 Private BlackBerry Limited show.

References

External links
 Van-Halen.com – The official Van Halen website
 Van Halen NewsDesk

Van Halen concert tours
2007 concert tours
2008 concert tours
Reunion concert tours